Crystal Lake Wind Farm is an electricity generating wind farm facility in Winnebago and Hancock County, Iowa, United States. It is owned by a subsidiary of Florida-based Next Era and began operations in 2008. With the completion of phase 3 of the project it has a generating capacity of 416 megawatts
. It is located roughly five miles from Britt, Iowa, and is on the edge of Crystal Lake, which the wind farm is named after.

References 

Energy infrastructure completed in 2008
Buildings and structures in Hancock County, Iowa
Wind farms in Iowa
2008 establishments in Iowa
NextEra Energy